Charles Sturt University is an Australian multi-campus public university located in New South Wales, Australian Capital Territory and Victoria. Established in 1989, it was named in honour of Captain Charles Napier Sturt, a British explorer who made expeditions into regional New South Wales and South Australia.

Charles Sturt offers undergraduate, postgraduate, higher degrees by research and single-subject study. It also has course delivery partnerships with several TAFE institutions across Australia, including with the New South Wales Police Force.

History
The history of Charles Sturt University dates to 1895, with the establishment of the Bathurst Experiment Farm. The university was established on 1 July 1989 from the merger of several existing separately-administered Colleges of Advanced Education with the enactment of The Charles Sturt University Act 1989 (Act No. 76, 1989). 

The constituent colleges included the Mitchell College of Advanced Education in Bathurst, the Riverina-Murray Institute of Higher Education in Albury-Wodonga and the Riverina College of Advanced Education in Wagga Wagga.

On 1 January 1970, the Mitchell College of Advanced Education was formed. The Riverina Murray Institute of Education campus in Wagga Wagga and Albury-Wodonga had operated since 1984. The latter institution had earlier succeeded the Riverina College of Advanced Education, which was itself the result of an even earlier merger between Wagga Agricultural College and the Wagga Wagga Teachers College.

By 1999, every online subject had specialised online support.

In 1998, Charles Sturt established the first Study Centre in Sydney and then in Melbourne in 2007. These study centres were operated by a private education group called Study Group Australia.

The Goulburn campus was established to deliver policing education to New South Wales Police.

In 1999, the Dubbo campus foundation stone was laid. The university also launched its China Joint Cooperation Program with four universities in China.

On 1 January 2005, Charles Sturt formalised moves to assume control of the University of Sydney’s Orange campus, which came into force on 1 January 2005. Between 2005 and 2015, the university had expanded to include an offshore campus in Burlington, Ontario, in Canada. On July 2015, Charles Sturt ceased to operate its Ontario campus due to the legislative and regulatory environment in Ontario.

In 2005, Charles Sturt responded to the shortage of veterinarians in rural and regional Australia with the first vet science students starting their degrees at the Wagga Wagga campus. And in 2008, the university also offered dentistry courses for the first time. This led to the development of five community-based clinics across its regional campuses.

On 14 February 2011, Charles Sturt University changed its logo. The Sturt's desert pea flower (Swainsona formosa) was stylised and made prominent, with the full name of the university as part of its logo.

On 1 May 2012, a milestone was reached as the university opened a new campus in Port Macquarie, its first coastal regional campus, making higher education accessible to the Port Macquarie and the Hastings region.

In 2013, the university implemented a gas engine cogeneration power plant to help minimise fuel costs and carbon emissions.

On 18 April 2016, staff and students at the Port Macquarie campus moved into stage one of their purpose-built campus. The second stage was completed in 2020 and included an NSW emergency services training room, innovation hub and student support facilities. The third stage is scheduled for completion over the coming years with an expected student intake of 5000 by 2030.

On 28 July 2016, Charles Sturt has declared Australia's First Official Carbon Neutral University. The Government of Australia's Carbon Neutral Program certified the university as "carbon neutral" against the National Carbon Offset Standard.

On 9 May 2018, Charles Sturt and Western Sydney University announced a partnership with the Australian Government's network, to establish the Murray-Darling Medical School, providing Joint Medical Programs across the Murray-Darling Basin Region. Charles Sturt's teaching base was established at the university's Orange campus to extend on the existing Western Sydney University program.

In May 2019, for its 30th anniversary, the university announced its new brand and visual identity. This included a new crest that draws on the original coat of arms and the logos of its predecessor institutions. The crest's design includes patterns that draw on the culture and symbolism of First Nations Australians and echoes the landscapes of regional NSW.

On 29 May 2019, Charles Sturt University announced it joined the Regional Universities Network (RUN), becoming the seventh member of the group.

In March 2021, Charles Sturt University's first medical students commenced study at the university's Orange campus, as part of the Joint Program in Medicine with Western Sydney University. The Joint Program in Medicine is designed to train doctors in the regions to help address the shortfall in rural and regional medical professionals.

Campuses
Charles Sturt University has six main campuses in Albury-Wodonga, Bathurst, Dubbo, Orange, Port Macquarie, and Wagga Wagga.

Albury-Wodonga

The Albury-Wodonga campus is situated on the border of NSW and Victoria. There is a strong focus on environmental Science, education, business and allied health at this campus.

Campus features:
 Anatomy and physiology labs
 Community Engagement and Wellness Centre
 Herbarium
 Wetlands

Bathurst

The Bathurst campus is home to engineering, communication, education, laws and a broad range of health degrees, including paramedicine and exercise science.

Campus features:
 Biochemistry, exercise science, nursing and paramedicine labs
 Dental and oral health clinic
 Engineering lab and facilities
 Media centre and 2MCE broadcasting radio station
 Television studies and editing suites

Dubbo

The Dubbo campus offers social work, nursing, and preparation courses with a focus on delivering education to First Nations students.

Campus features:
 Nursing and clinical lab
 Dental and oral health clinic
 Interactive learning centre

Orange

The Orange campus offers courses with a strong focus on allied health, medical sciences, dentistry, medicine, and pharmacy.

Campus features:
 Medical learning facilities: anatomy teaching lab, simulation hospital wards and ultrasound room
 Chemistry, pharmacy, physiotherapy and rehabilitation science labs
 Dental and oral health clinic

Port Macquarie

The Port Macquarie campus is the university's newest and first coastal, regional campus. Course offerings at the campus continue to expand as the university's presence in the Mid-North Coast grows.

Campus features:
 Paramedicine simulation clinic
 Medical imaging and nursing labs
 Anatomy and physiology labs
 Practical learning rooms: occupational therapy, physiotherapy and exercise science facilities

Wagga Wagga

Situated on the banks of the Murrumbidgee River, the Wagga Wagga campus is the university's agricultural and sciences hub. Students can also study a range of animal and veterinary sciences, education, business, allied health, information technology, and humanities degrees.

Campus features:
 National Life Sciences Hub
 Veterinary science clinical centre and labs
 Farm and equine centre
 Commercial winery
 Dental and oral health clinic

Other study locations
 A centre in Goulburn for policing students
 A Regional University Study Centre in Wangaratta for combined TAFE and university study
 Study locations in Canberra and Parramatta for theology students
 Partner locations for selected courses in Crows Nest, Canberra, Chadstone, and Muresk

Faculties and academic departments

Charles Sturt University has three main faculties, each offering a range of courses and discipline opportunities. Each faculty comprises a number of schools and centres for specific areas of study and research:
 Faculty of Arts and Education
 Faculty of Business, Justice and Behavioural Sciences
 Faculty of Science and Health

Faculty of Arts and Education
The faculty's arts discipline covers performing and visual arts, art history, communications, history, human services, First Nations studies, literature, philosophy, sociology, and theology. The education side of the faculty offers a range of courses in teacher education, and information and library studies. Schools and centres include:

 Centre for Islamic Studies and Civilisation
 School of Education
 School of Indigenous Australian Studies
 School of Information and Communication Studies
School of Social Work and Arts
School of Theology

Faculty of Business, Justice and Behavioural Sciences
This faculty brings together a range of courses in areas of business, justice and behavioural sciences disciplines. The justice side of the faculty covers policing, security, law, customs, excise and border management. The behavioural science discipline offers psychology courses. Schools and centres include:

 Australian Graduate School of Policing and Security
 Centre for Customs and Excise Studies
 Centre for Law and Justice
 School of Business
 School of Computing, Mathematics and Engineering
 School of Policing Studies
School of Psychology

Faculty of Science and Health
The science faculty is one of the most broadly based scientific academic concentrations in Australasia. Schools include:

 School  of Agricultural, Environmental and Veterinary Sciences
 School of Allied Health, Exercise and Sports Sciences
 School of Dentistry and Medical Sciences
 School of Nursing, Paramedicine and Healthcare Sciences
 School of Rural Medicine

Academia

Courses
Charles Sturt University offers courses across the following career areas:
 Agricultural and wine sciences
 Allied health and pharmacy
 Animal and veterinary sciences
 Business
 Christian theology and ministry
 Communication and creative industries
 Dentistry and oral health
 Engineering
 Environmental Sciences
 Exercise and sports sciences
 Humanities, social work and human services
 Information and library studies
 Information technology, computing and mathematics
 Islamic and Arabic studies
 Medical and health sciences
 Medicine
 Nursing, midwifery and Indigenous health
 Policing, law, security, customs and emergency management
 Psychology
 Science
 Teaching and Education

Library
Charles Sturt University libraries operate at its main campuses. The libraries offer eBooks, eJournals, encyclopaedias, multimedia resources and course readings through Primo Search. The libraries also provide online library workshops, library resource guides and video tutorials.

Awards, rankings and recognition

Graduate employment rate
Charles Sturt University has the highest graduate employment rate in Australia. More than 84.7 per cent of undergraduates find full-time employment within four months of graduating. The Quality Indicators for Learning and Teaching (QILT) 2021 Graduate Outcomes Survey (GOS) – Longitudinal found 93.9 per cent of Charles Sturt University undergraduates were in full-time employment three years after graduation. The survey also found that 95.2 per cent of the university's postgraduate coursework graduates were in full-time employment three years after graduation.

Times Higher Education Impact Rankings
In 2021, Charles Sturt University was named in the top 10 per cent of universities worldwide for climate action by the Times Higher Education Impact Rankings.

Australia’s first carbon-neutral university
Charles Sturt University was the first carbon-neutral university in Australia and the institution continues to focus on creating a sustainable future. On 28 July 2016, the institution was certified as ‘carbon-neutral’ by the National Carbon Offset Standard – Carbon-Neutral Program, administered by the Federal Department of the Environment and Energy.

The university has nearly 16,000 solar panels installed across its campuses – enough to power for more than 2000 homes. More than 22,000 native trees have been planted across its campuses since 2010.

Professor Stan Grant
In 2020, Professor Stan Grant commenced a new role at Charles Sturt as the Vice-Chancellor's Chair of Australian-Indigenous Belonging. Professor Grant Jnr was appointed Chair of Indigenous Affairs in 2016. He has decades of experience as an educator, journalist and film producer to explore and answer questions of belonging, home, history and identity.

Graduate Certificate in Wiradjuri Language, Culture and Heritage
In 2014, Charles Sturt announced a new Graduate Certificate in Wiradjuri Language, Culture and Heritage to help Wiradjuri and non-Wiradjuri people preserve the community's language for future generations. The Wiradjuri people were the First Nations peoples of the Central West and western slopes and plains region of NSW.

Research
Charles Sturt University conducts research across many disciplines, including agricultural and veterinary science; education; biological, environmental and chemical sciences; ethics and philosophy.

Cooperative Research Centres
Charles Sturt works collaboratively on many research projects with all levels of government and industry, including its Cooperative Research Centres (CRCs). The university is involved with four CRCs: Food and Agility, High-Performance Soils, Cyber Security, and National Marine Bioproducts Research Centre. The centres are a Federal Government initiative to solve industry problems, while also improving competitiveness and sustainability. The university aims to achieve this through collaborations between industry, research and community sectors.

Student life

Student Senate
Students at Charles Sturt University are represented by Charles Sturt University Student Senate – formerly the CSU Students' Association (CSUSA). Charles Sturt's Student Senate is the overarching university student body and comprises the following affiliates:

 Orange Student Representative Committee (OSRC) – formerly Orange Students Association (OSA)
 Murray Campus Council (MCC) representing Albury-Wodonga Campus – formerly Murray Campus Students' Association
 Bathurst Student Representative Committee (Bathurst SRC) – formerly Mitchell Student Guild, Charles Sturt University Students' Association Bathurst (CSUSAB) and Mitchell Association of Student Councils
 Dubbo Student Representative Committee (DSRC)
 Rivcoll Student Representative Committee (Rivcoll SRC) representing Wagga Wagga campus – formerly Rivcoll Union Inc
 Port Student Representative Committee (Port SRC) representing the Port Macquarie campus
 Online Study Student Representative Committee (OS SRC) representing Charles Sturt's online students
 Canberra Student Representative Committee, known as St Mark's Canberra was previously formed but disbanded in 2016.

Sport
The Charles Sturt University Football Club at Bathurst was formed under the name of Bathurst Teachers College in 1963, making it one of the oldest football clubs in Bathurst. The club changed its name multiple times to match the educational institute, gaining its current name when Mitchell College was rebranded to Charles Sturt University.

Governance
Charles Sturt University is governed by a 16-member Council, whose members include the Chancellor and Vice-Chancellor. Dr Michele Allan, a company director, food industry and agribusiness specialist, with an academic background in biomedical science, management and law, is the current and third Chancellor of the university since 3 December 2014; and Professor Renée Leon became the fifth Vice-Chancellor on 1 September 2021.

Notable people

Members of Charles Sturt University alumni include notable TV presenters Andrew Denton, Amanda Keller, Latika Bourke and Hamish Macdonald.

See also

List of universities in Australia
Centre for Applied Philosophy and Public Ethics
St Mark's National Theological Centre

References

 
Education in Bathurst, New South Wales
Education in Albury, New South Wales
Dubbo
Education in Wagga Wagga
Universities in New South Wales
1989 establishments in Australia
Educational institutions established in 1989
Charles Sturt